A regional election took place in Brittany on March 16, 1986, along with all other regions.

1986 elections in France
1986